Vitali Viktorovich Gabnia (Abkhazian:Виталик Виктор-иҧа Габниа; Russian: Виталий Викторович Габния) was Vice President of Abkhazia from 2014 to 2018. He was elected along with President Raul Khajimba following the May 2014 revolution against previous President Alexander Ankvab, which Khajimba and he had led. Gabnia is Chairman of the veterans organisation Aruaa. He resigned after being caught in a brawl in August 2018.

Career
Gabnia was elected as Chairman of Aruaa during its congress on 30 July 2013, succeeding acting Chairman Daur Achugba and following the resignation of previous Chairman Vadim Smyr.

On 22 August 2018, Gabnia announced his resignation as vice-president, citing the need to "defend his honor" after being caught in a brawl and being hit in his head. He added the offender was not brought to justice due to the existing "system of lawlessness", but his resignation was not connected to "political realities".

References

Vice presidents of Abkhazia
Living people
Vice-presidential candidates in the 2014 Abkhazian presidential election
1968 births